Erbium phosphide is a binary inorganic compound of erbium and phosphorus with the chemical formula ErP.

Synthesis
Erbium phosphide can be formed by the reaction of erbium and phosphorus:
4 Er + P4 → 4 ErP

Physical properties
ErP forms crystals of a cubic system, space group Fm3m.

References

Phosphides
Erbium compounds
Rock salt crystal structure